Seasick may refer to:  

 Seasickness, a form of motion sickness characterized by a feeling of nausea and, in extreme cases, vertigo experienced after spending time on a craft on water
 Seasick (album), the first album (1996) by indie rock band Imperial Teen
 "Seasick" (song), a single (2011) by the alt rock band Silversun Pickups
 Sea Sick, an episode of Hi Hi Puffy AmiYumi

Other
  Seasick Steve, Blues musician
 An alternative title for the 1996 Sweden-Finland-France film Merisairas